Jovan Popović (18 November 1905 – 13 February 1952) was a Serbian writer and academic.

Popović was born in Kikinda, in modern-day Serbia. He joined the Yugoslav Partisans in the beginning of the armed struggle in Serbia in 1941. He became a member of the Serbian Academy of Sciences and Arts on November 14, 1950. His statue stands on the square of his hometown of Kikinda and a grammar school in Belgrade is named after him.

Selected works 
 Knjiga drugova (1929)
 Reda mora da bude (1932)
 Lica u prolazu (1941)
 Istinite legende (1944)

References 

1905 births
1952 deaths
Writers from Kikinda
Serbian male poets
Yugoslav Partisans members
20th-century Serbian poets
Burials at Belgrade New Cemetery